Peter Paul Felner (1884–1927) was an Austrian-Hungarian screenwriter and film director.

Selected filmography

Director
 Prinz und Tänzerin (1920)
 Marquis Fun (1920)
 The Earl of Essex (1922)
 The Merchant of Venice (1923)
 Prater (1924)
 The Golden Calf (1925)
 The World Wants To Be Deceived (1926)
 Das Meer (1927)

Bibliography
 Janik, Vicki. The Merchant of Venice: A Guide to the Play. Greenwood Publishing Group, 2003.

External links

1884 births
1927 deaths
Austrian film directors
German-language film directors
Hungarian film directors
Hungarian screenwriters
Austrian male screenwriters
Hungarian male writers
Writers from Budapest
20th-century Austrian screenwriters
20th-century Austrian male writers